Switched at Birth (also known as Mistaken Identity and Two Babies: Switched at Birth ), American made-for-television drama film released in 1999 by Alexander/Enright & Associates and Carlton America. It was filmed in Newberg, Oregon and Portland, Oregon.

Plot
Two baby boys, born more or less at the same time, were switched soon after they had been born. When their families accidentally discover it eighteen months later, they start having troubles to decide who their real children are – the one they have been raising or the one they gave birth to.

Cast
 Melissa Gilbert as Sarah Barlow  
 Rosanna Arquette as Linda Wells  
 David Andrews as James Barlow 
 Ron Snyder as Bert Wells  
 James McCaffrey as Darryl
 Mary Mara as Judy
 Susan Barnes as Marie
 Robert Blanche as Dr. Nurenberg

External links

References

1999 television films
1999 films
1999 drama films
CBS network films
Films shot in Oregon
Films shot in Portland, Oregon
1990s English-language films